Chernyshovka is a rural locality (a khutor) in Lizinovskoye Rural Settlement, Rossoshansky District, Voronezh Oblast, Russia. The population was 212 as of 2010.

Geography 
Chernyshovka is located 11 km southwest of Rossosh (the district's administrative centre) by road. Artyomovo is the nearest rural locality.

References 

Rural localities in Rossoshansky District